Lal-e Mina (also Romanized as La‘l-e Mīnā; also known as La‘l-e Mīneh) is a village in Zilayi Rural District, Margown District, Boyer-Ahmad County, Kohgiluyeh and Boyer-Ahmad Province, Iran. At the 2006 census, its population was 290, in 63 families.

References 

Populated places in Boyer-Ahmad County